Events in the year 2021 in the United Arab Emirates.

Incumbents
 President: Khalifa bin Zayed Al Nahyan
 Prime Minister: Mohammed bin Rashid Al Maktoum

Events

January
24 January:
The cabinet of the United Arab Emirates approves the establishment of an embassy in Tel Aviv.
Israel opens an embassy in the United Arab Emirates, appointing Eitan Na'eh as head of the envoy. It will be in a temporary office, until a permanent location will be set up.

June 

 11 June — During the 2021 United Nations Security Council Elections, the United Arab Emirates was elected to serve a two-year term as a non-permanent member of the United Nations Security Council. It marked the second time the UAE has sat on the Security Council.

October 

 1 October - The Dubai World Expo 2020. Delayed from 2020 to 2021 due to Covid-19 restrictions. 
 15 October - IPL 2021 was hosted across Abu Dhabi, Dubai and Sharjah.

December

 12 December – Max Verstappen wins the Abu Dhabi Grand Prix and the Championship against Lewis Hamilton.

 13 December – Prime Minister of Israel Naftali Bennett and Sheikh Mohamed bin Zayed Al Nahyan discuss strengthening bilateral trade and cooperation in multiple areas, at the first meeting of the leaders of the two countries.

Deaths 

 24 March - Hamdan bin Rashid Al Maktoum, politician (b. 1945)
 18 April - Abdullah Al-Nauri, novelist (b. 1959)
 19 June - Alaa al-Siddiq, human rights activist (b. 1988)
 17 December - Majid Al Futtaim, businessman (b. 1934)

References

 
Years of the 21st century in the United Arab Emirates
United Arab Emirates
United Arab Emirates
2020s in the United Arab Emirates